Tsyrkuny is a village in Kharkiv Raion (district) in Kharkiv Oblast of eastern Ukraine, at about  north-east from the centre of Kharkiv city. It hosts the administration of Tsyrkuny rural hromada, one of the hromadas of Ukraine.

The settlement came under attack by Russian forces during the Russian invasion of Ukraine in 2022.

Demographics
The settlement had 6310 inhabitants in 2001, native language distribution as of the Ukrainian Census of 2001:
 Ukrainian: 75.88%
 Russian: 23.20%
 Belarusian: 0.25%
 Moldovan (Romanian): 0.22%
 Armenian: 0.17%
 other languages: 0.56%

References

Villages in Kharkiv Raion
Kharkovsky Uyezd